Andrew Burns may refer to:

 Andrew Burns (Royal Navy officer) (born 1969)
 Andrew Burns, Northern Irish member of the Real IRA, murdered by Óglaigh na hÉireann
 Andrew J. Burns Jr. (1927–2010), member of the Maryland House of Delegates
 Andy Burns (born 1990), American baseball infielder